Anderson County is a county located in the U.S. state of Kentucky. As of the 2020 census, the population was 23,852. Its county seat is Lawrenceburg. The county was formed in 1827 and named for Richard Clough Anderson Jr., a Kentucky legislator, U.S. Congressman and Minister to Colombia. Anderson County is part of the Frankfort, KY Micropolitan Statistical Area, which is also included in the Lexington-Fayette-Richmond-Frankfort, KY Combined Statistical Area.

History
Anderson County was established in 1827 from land given by Franklin, Mercer, and Washington counties.

Geography
The county is in the heart of the Kentucky Bluegrass region along the Kentucky River.

Adjacent counties
 Franklin County  (north)
 Woodford County  (east)
 Mercer County  (southeast)
 Washington County  (south)
 Nelson County  (southwest)
 Spencer County  (west)
 Shelby County  (northwest)

Demographics

As of the census of 2020, there were 23,852 people, 9,539 housing units, and 8,694 households with an average family size of 2.57 per household residing in the county. The population density was 106.1 per square mile (36/km2).  The racial makeup of the county was 95.10% White, 2.10% Black or African American, 0.3% Native American, 0.7% Asian, 0.01% Pacific Islander, 0.17% from other races, and 1.8% from two or more races.  1.9% of the population were Hispanic or Latino of any race.

There were 8,694 households, of which 33.80% had children under the age of 18 living with them, 50.2% were married couples living together, 27.1% had a female householder with no husband present. 32.79% of all households were made up of individuals without children, and 12.1% had someone living alone who was 65 years of age or older. The average household size was 2.57 and the average family size was 3.03.

Age distribution was 23.5% under the age of 18, 11.8% from 15 to 24, 24.3% from 25 to 44, 28.9% from 45 to 64, and 16.3% who were 65 years of age or older. The median age was 41.4 years and the population is estimated to be 51% Female and 49% Male.

The median household income was $55,334, and the median family income was $67,681. Males had a median full-time income of $47,027 versus $38,894 for females. The per capita income for the county was $27,250. About 12.2% of families and 15.7% of the population were below the poverty line, including 23.8% of those under age 18 and 8.7% of those age 65 or over.

Politics

Voter Registration

Statewide Elections

Communities
 Alton
 Ballard
 Glensboro
 Lawrenceburg
 McBrayer
 Stringtown

Ghost towns
 Ripyville
 Tyrone

See also
 National Register of Historic Places listings in Anderson County, Kentucky

References

 
1827 establishments in Kentucky
Populated places established in 1827
Kentucky counties
Frankfort, Kentucky micropolitan area